John William Wilkinson (9 April 1887–1955) was an English footballer who played in the Football League for Manchester City.

References

1879 births
1954 deaths
English footballers
Association football midfielders
English Football League players
Manchester City F.C. players